Charles Edward Brown (August 17, 1871 – April 3, 1938) was a professional baseball pitcher. He started four games for the Cleveland Spiders of Major League Baseball in 1897, with one win and two losses.

External links

Major League Baseball pitchers
Cleveland Spiders players
Scranton Coal Heavers players
Grand Rapids Rippers players
Dayton Old Soldiers players
Toledo Mud Hens players
Dayton Veterans players
Baseball players from Indiana
1871 births
1938 deaths
19th-century baseball players
People from Bluffton, Indiana